Pranas Kūris (born 20 August 1938 in Šeduva, Radviliškis district) is a Lithuanian lawyer. He is the first representative of Lithuania in the European Court of Justice and European Court of Human Rights.

Pranas Kūris has graduated the Law Faculty of Vilnius University in 1961 and has worked as a lecturer in the Department of the International and European Union Law of the Faculty.

He worked in the field  of International public law. He was People's Minister of Justice of Lithuanian SSR from 1977 to 1990.

Pranas Kūris was the first ambassador of the newly independent Lithuania to Belgium, Luxembourg and the Netherlands (1992–1994).

Pranas Kūris was appointed as a  judge from Lithuania to the European Court of Justice in 2004. Pranas Kūris son, Egidijus Kūris has been the President of the Lithuanian Constitutional Court.

References
 Ten new members of the Court of Justice of the European Communities - Formal Sitting of 11 May 2004. European Court of Justice.
  [https://web.archive.org/web/20110717200840/http://www.lms.lt/ML/200202/20020213.htm Teisininku ir Diplomatu Mokytojas - Lietuvos Teises Universiteto Garbes Daktaras. Lithuanian Scientific Society.

See also 
List of members of the European Court of Justice
Law of Lithuania
Danutė Jočienė
Egidijus Kūris

Judges of the European Court of Human Rights
European Court of Justice judges
Ambassadors of Lithuania to Belgium
Ambassadors of Lithuania to Luxembourg
Ambassadors of Lithuania to the Netherlands
Justice ministers of the Lithuanian Soviet Socialist Republic
International law scholars
Living people
1938 births
Lithuanian legal scholars
Lithuanian communists
Presidents of the Supreme Court of Lithuania
Vilnius University alumni
Academic staff of Vilnius University
Lithuanian judges
People from Šeduva
Lithuanian judges of international courts and tribunals